The agglomeration community Annemasse – Les Voirons is an intercommunal structure located in Haute-Savoie, France. It consists of the town Annemasse and 11 neighbouring communes. It is located at the Swiss border, east of Geneva, between the mountains Salève and Voirons. Its area is 78.2 km2. Its population was 90,378 in 2018, of which 36,250 in Annemasse proper.

History 
In 1966, the communes of Ambilly, Annemasse, Etrembières, Gaillard, Ville-la-Grand and Vétraz-Monthoux formed the syndicat intercommunal à vocations multiples of the Annemasse agglomeration. This cooperation became a communauté de communes on January 1, 2002. The communauté de communes of the Annemasse agglomeration and the communauté de communes of the Voirons merged to form the present agglomeration community in 2008.

Communes 
The communauté d'agglomération consists of the following 12 communes:

Annemasse
Ambilly
Bonne
Cranves-Sales
Étrembières
Gaillard
Juvigny
Lucinges
Machilly
Saint-Cergues
Vétraz-Monthoux
Ville-la-Grand

Politics

Communitary council
The conseil is composed of 79 delegates of municipal councils of member communes.

References

External links 
 Official tourism site of Annemasse - Les Voirons agglomeration
 Official site of Annemasse - Les Voirons agglomeration

Annemasse
Annemasse